Ian Fells  is Emeritus Professor of Energy Conversion at the University of Newcastle upon Tyne, and former chairman of the "New and Renewable Energy Centre" at Blyth, Northumberland, England.

Education and career
Fells was educated at King Edward VII School, Broomhill, Sheffield, then carried out national service in the British army, before studying at Trinity College, Cambridge where he gained an M.A. then in 1958 a Ph.D. entitled "The kinetics of the hydrolysis of the chlorinated methanes".
After lecturing in Chemical Engineering and Fuel Technology  at the University of Sheffield he was appointed Reader in Fuel Science at King's College of University of Durham in 1962.  In 1963 this college became the University of Newcastle upon Tyne, and he was on the staff of the Chemical Engineering Department. He has been Professor of Energy Conversion at Newcastle University since 1975 and has published some 200 papers on a varied range of topics, including:

The chemical physics of combustion
fuel cells
rocket combustion
energy economics
environmental protection
energy conversion systems
energy policy

Fells is a long-standing advocate of nuclear power. As of 2008, Fells was of the view that "any notion that renewables can provide for all our [energy] requirements is a mischievous and reckless boast".

Honours
In 1976 Fells was awarded the Beilby Medal and Prize. He was then elected Fellow of The Royal Academy of Engineering in 1979 and was President of The Institute of Energy (now the Energy Institute) for 1978-79. In 1993 he received the Michael Faraday medal and prize from the Royal Society, and was elected Fellow of The Royal Society of Edinburgh in 1996. He was awarded the Melchett Medal of the Energy Institute in 1999 and the John Collier Medal of the Institution of Chemical Engineers in the same year. He was awarded a CBE in June 2000. In the same year he presented the Higginson Lecture at Durham University.

Other activities
Fells has made over 500 television and radio programmes, including the TV popular science series Take Nobody's Word For It with Carol Vorderman, and appeared as guest expert on The Great Egg Race in 1985.

He has been science adviser to the World Energy Council and special adviser to select committees of both the House of Lords and the House of Commons as well as serving on several Cabinet and Research Council committees. He was chairman of the UK-based National Renewable Energy Centre (Narec) and is an energy adviser to the European Union and European Parliament, has advised a number of Foreign Governments on energy policy and is a consultant to various multi-national companies.

In 2012 he created a Newcastle-based company, Penultimate Power, to develop small modular reactors.

His wife is Hazel, a mathematician, and they have four sons, all engineers.

References

External links
 Biography at Incoteco.com
 Biography and publications
 , Ian Fells, 2012

English physicists
English engineers
British chemical engineers
Engineering academics
People educated at King Edward VII School, Sheffield
Alumni of Trinity College, Cambridge
Academics of Durham University
Academics of Newcastle University
Academics of the University of Sheffield
Fellows of the Royal Academy of Engineering
Fellows of the Royal Society of Edinburgh
Commanders of the Order of the British Empire
Living people
Year of birth missing (living people)
Place of birth missing (living people)